is an unmanned lighthouse in Eboshijima, a tiny island administered by Itoshima, Fukuoka, Japan.  The island is in Karatsu Bay.

History

This lighthouse was one of those designed by Richard Henry Brunton, who was hired by the government of Japan in the Meiji period to help construct lighthouses to make it safe for foreign ships to come to Japan following the opening of Japan to the West.

See also

 List of lighthouses in Japan

References

External links
 Photo gallery 

Lighthouses in Japan
Lighthouses completed in 1875
Buildings and structures in Fukuoka Prefecture